is a Japanese footballer currently playing as a midfielder for JEF United Chiba.

Career statistics

Club
.

Notes

References

1999 births
Living people
Association football people from Tokyo
Toin University of Yokohama alumni
Japanese footballers
Association football midfielders
JEF United Chiba players